Conspiracy? is a documentary television series that was created and originally aired on The History Channel that examines recent historical events from the perspective of conspiracy theory.

Premiering in 2004 and hosted by Tom Kane, notable episodes have examined the President John F. Kennedy assassination, the Senator Robert F. Kennedy assassination, the conspiracy theory that President Franklin Roosevelt had knowledge of the Japanese attack on Pearl Harbor before December 7, 1941, and theories about government agencies covering up UFO reports. It is one of the few conspiracy theory shows to not cover the 9/11 terrorist attack, while it is mentioned in a few episodes. The show is unique in that it also shows evidence that the subject conspiracy theory is not a conspiracy and isn't presented from a biased pro-conspiracy argument.

In 2009, the entire series was released in a box set DVD.

Episodes
 TWA Flight 800
 Majestic Twelve: UFO Cover-Up
 FDR and Pearl Harbor
 Area 51
 Who killed Martin Luther King, Jr.?
 Princess Diana
 Lincoln Assassination
 Oklahoma City bombing
 The CIA and the Nazis
 Jack Ruby
 RFK Assassination
 Kecksburg UFO

External links
  
 Conspiracy? episode on FDR and Pearl Harbor listing
 TV.com

History (American TV channel) original programming
Television series about conspiracy theories